Raja Ahmad Nazim Azlan Shah bin Almarhum Raja Ashman Shah (born 10 March 1994) is a member of the Perak Royal Family. He is the current Raja Kecil Sulong of Perak, making him fourth in line to the throne of the Perak Sultanate.

Family background
Raja Ahmad Nazim is the only son of the late Raja Ashman Shah and Noraini Jane binti Kamarul Ariffin. His paternal grandfather was the late Sultan Azlan Shah of Perak, while his paternal grandmother is Tuanku Bainun, the former Raja Permaisuri, or Queen, of Perak. His maternal grandfather is Kamarul Ariffin Mohamed Yassin, a former senator and the former chairman of Bank Bumiputra Malaysia Berhad. He is of Malays and British descent.

Raja Ahmad Nazim's paternal uncle is the current Sultan of Perak, Nazrin Shah.

His sisters are Raja Eminah Alliyah and Raja Bainunisa Safia.

Education
Raja Ahmad Nazim attended elementary school at Sekolah Kebangsaan Bukit Damansara. He graduated secondary school from Garden International School. After completing his A-Level's in England at Marlborough College, Raja Ahmad Nazim attended Cambridge University, his father's alma mater. During university, Raja Ahmad Nazim was inducted to the Asam Bois College Hall of Fame.

References

Royal House of Perak
1994 births
People from Perak
Malaysian people of Malay descent
Malaysian Muslims
Living people
Malaysian people of British descent
Malaysian people of English descent
People educated at Marlborough College
Alumni of the University of Cambridge